Laissey is a commune in the Doubs department in the Bourgogne-Franche-Comté region in eastern France.

Geography 
The village lies in the deep valley of the river Doubs. The Cascade du Rougnon is a 17-meter waterfall.

Population

Economy 
The village housed a mill from its inception, which served the villages of the Roulans plateau and Bouclans.

At the beginning of the 19th century, an iron mine was opened that employed up to 60 miners. However, with the arrival of the railroad in 1860, the mine was closed.

About 1870, a textile mill was established on the site of the old mill. It employed about 30 women, but it closed when the Bost brothers opened a tool factory at the end of the 19th century. From that time on, the village grew along with the factory. Of its 500 inhabitants, 200 worked at the factory.

See also
 Communes of the Doubs department

References

External links

 Laissey on the intercommunal Web site of the department 

Communes of Doubs